This page details the match results and statistics of the Tajikistan women's national football team.

Tajikistan women's national football team is the representative of Tajikistan in international women's association football, It is governed by the Tajikistan Football Federation (FFT) and it competes as a member of the Asian Football Confederation (AFC).

the national team's first activity was in 2017. where the team started its women's football journey with an International Friendly against Kyrgyzstan as a preparation for their 2018 AFC Women's Asian Cup qualification campaign, in which they played in an international tournament for the first time. Tajikistan opened their qualification tournament with a promising win against Iraq. however, the Tajiks lost their four next games finishing fifth ahead of Iraq whom they have beaten on the first day. the team is currently ranked 144th in the FIFA Women's World Rankings, ranked 30th in the Asian continent.

Record per opponent
Key

The following table shows Tajikistan' all-time official international record per opponent:

Results

2017

2018

2019

2021

2022

See also
 Tajikistan national football team results
 Football in Tajikistan

References

External links
 Tajikistan results on The Roon Ba
 Tajikistan results on Globalsports
 Tajikistan results on soccerway

2010s in Tajikistan
2020s in Tajikistan
Women's national association football team results
results